Voyageur Aviation operating as Voyageur Airways Limited is an airline based in North Bay, Ontario, Canada that commenced operations in 1968. Along with air charters it also repairs and maintains aircraft, and provides an air ambulance] service. It provides ground handling, fuel services and terminal services at the North Bay/Jack Garland Airport. It provides chartered aircraft to the United Nations and NATO, for operations in places such as Afghanistan, Democratic Republic of Congo, Chad, Ivory Coast and Sudan. These aircraft include Bombardier Dash 8 turboprops as well as Bombardier CRJ200 regional jets.

Fleet
As of August 2022, Voyageur Airways had the following aircraft registered with Transport Canada:

According to Voyageur Airways they also operate de Havilland Canada Dash 7 as air ambulance.

Destinations in 1987

Although no longer operating scheduled flights, according to its May 10, 1987 system timetable, Voyageur Airways was operating scheduled passenger service to the following destinations in the Canadian provinces of Ontario and Quebec:

Ontario
Manitouwadge
Marathon
North Bay - home base
Ottawa
Peterborough
Sudbury
Toronto
Windsor

Quebec
Montreal
Rouyn
Val-d'Or

Currently Voyageur Airways operates charters and does aircraft servicing.

References

External links

Official site

Airlines established in 1968
Air Transport Association of Canada
Canadian companies established in 1968
Companies based in North Bay, Ontario
Regional airlines of Ontario
1968 establishments in Ontario